"Holiday" is an original song written by Dilana, about how her life has changed after appearing on Rock Star: Supernova. On February 20, it was released with "Ring of Fire" as a B-side track, exclusively on digital download websites such as iTunes and MySpace (through Snocap), where fans can also listen to the full version for free. It is the first single from her U.S. debut album, Inside Out, which was released on November 17, 2009.

Recording information
Co-writing/ Vocals - Dilana

Co-Writing/Producing/Multiple Instruments - Dave Bassett

Mastering - Brian Gardner

Drums - Adrian Young (No Doubt)

Drum Tracks - Andrew Alekel (Grandmaster Recorders)

Track listing

Music videos
Dilana released a home-made music video for "Holiday" on YouTube on March 6, 2007. She used footage from  her first six months after her rise to fame on Rock Star: Supernova, covering everything from her trips to Iceland to her first independent tour in the United States. Fans can watch the video by clicking on the following link: Holiday unofficial music video

In November 2009, the official music video premiered on Entertainment Weekly. The music video made its official television debut on LCN's The Vault on November 20, 2009 at 8:30 pm.

Allison Iraheta version
American Idol Season 8 contestant Allison Iraheta covered "Holiday" on her debut album, Just Like You.

In an interview with Lyndsey Parker of Yahoo! Music, who tells Iraheta that her cover of "Holiday" is the song on Just Like You she's most excited about, Iraheta said,

Later in the same interview, Allison said, "it is a little intimidating (to cover a song by someone you respect) at first cause I was like 'wow, this is so good,' but we're different." Rock Star: Supernova runner-up Dilana has also praised Iraheta, saying that she is "the only chic I would ever want to cover my song," calling her "so smart ... so talented" and saying that she had a "beautiful future ahead."

Reception 
Iraheta's cover of the song has been received positively. Jim Cantiello, from MTV writes "Iraheta's rock and roll swagger is in full swing on this rock and roll shuffle, co-written by fellow reality star Dilana," adding that 'Holiday' should be released as a single." Lyndsey Parker, from Yahoo! music called it a "glam-rock stomper." Michael Slezak, of Entertainment Weekly, writes, "The second I heard 'Holiday,' I thought to myself: 'This ditty should go directly to The Rocker (referring to Iraheta) — without passing go, and without collecting $200.'"

References

2007 singles
Songs written by Dave Bassett (songwriter)
2007 songs